The Sword of Many Loves, also known as The Sword of Many Lovers, is a 1993 Hong Kong film based on Jin Yong's novel The Young Flying Fox. The film was produced by Golden Harvest and directed by Poon Man-kit.

Plot
Wu Fei (Leon Lai) and his uncle Ping travel together as brick salesmen. They find themselves traveling to the home of Ling (Michelle Reis) to deliver bricks for the grave of Ling's recently deceased master, who himself was the mastermind behind a sect of poisoner's and as such was in possession of a medical manual.

Other members of his poisoner's sect now want the medical manual for themselves, this results in an absurd assassination attempt on Ling, featuring a lot of slapstick comedy.

After witnessing this trouble, Fei and Ping run away and end up in Nanking, it is here that they learn their friend Chung has been framed by Young Fung, son of the local crime boss Master Fung. Fei and Ping intervene against the crime boss which leads to the death of Ping. Fei retreats from the scene but vows revenge for the murder of his uncle, after this Fei meets Purple Yuen who aims to stop the martial arts leaders from being distracted and return them back to their task of restoring the Ming Dynasty through a government-backed martial arts contest. Yuen wishes to beat all the leaders and claim the title for herself.

Fei and Yuen then travel together, developing a romantic relationship with several elements of comedy. Fei then confronts Master Fung, Fei almost kills Master Fung but is stopped by Yuen, who is Master Fung's daughter. It is revealed that Fung killed Yuen's mother's family which caused her mother to commit suicide. Yuen only stops Fei from killing Fung so that she may kill Fung herself as revenge. However Yuen is poisoned by Fung (causing her bottom to inflate), Fei then takes her to Ling to be cured.

Ling has now fallen in love with Fei and will only cure Yuen if Fei breaks off his romantic relationship with Yuen. This leads to several comedic scenes and catfights until Yuen is finally cured. All three then attend the martial arts contest together with the aim of killing all the martial arts sects, culminating in a final showdown between Master Fung and Fei.

Cast
 Note: The characters' names are in Cantonese romanisation.

 Leon Lai as Woo Fei
 Michelle Reis as Ching Ling-so
 Sharla Cheung as Yuen Tze-yi
 Elvis Tsui as Fung Nam-tin
 Kingdom Yuen as Mo Yung
 William Ho as Sit Hei
 Jassie Lam

External links
 
 

1993 films
Films based on works by Jin Yong
Hong Kong martial arts films
Films set in the Qing dynasty
Wuxia films
Works based on Flying Fox of Snowy Mountain
1990s Hong Kong films